Paragliding at the 2018 Asian Games was held at the Gunung Mas, West Java, Indonesia. It was held from 20 to 29 August 2018.

Schedule

Medalists

Men

Women

Medal table

Participating nations
A total of 98 athletes from 18 nations competed in paragliding at the 2018 Asian Games:

References

External links
Paragliding at the 2018 Asian Games
Official Result Book – Paragliding

 
2018 Asian Games events
Asian Games
2018